Real life is just beginning for these group of friends in West Beverly Hills. This season follows the group as they navigate life after high school as their final summer together comes to an end. Their paths towards adulthood will see them going in different directions while attempting to maintain the connection that served them so well in high school. Friendships, connections, and loyalties will be put to the test as this close-knit group of friends meets new people. Some will go to college, while others will start their careers. It's a new, but yet different era for them, with the stakes much greater and a lot more to lose. However, anything can happen when they live in a world of glitz and wealth, with endless opportunities in front of them. In this most famous, and iconic zip code, it's just another day.

Trevor Donovan was dropped as a regular, as a result of ongoing changes by the new showrunners. He returned as a guest star in the fall to conclude his storyline. However, in late February 2012, it was reported that Donovan would return near the end of the season. The CW ordered two additional episodes for the season, which total at 24. It has also been announced that the show got a fifth and final season.

Season four opened to a 0.9 rating in adults 18–49, even with last season premiere. The series returned from its mid-season break on January 17, 2012, one week later than originally announced.

Cast

Regular
 Shenae Grimes as Annie Wilson (24 episodes)
 Tristan Wilds as Dixon Wilson (21 episodes)
 AnnaLynne McCord as Naomi Clark (24 episodes) 
 Jessica Stroup as Erin Silver (24 episodes)
 Michael Steger as Navid Shirazi (19 episodes)
 Jessica Lowndes as Adrianna Tate-Duncan (24 episodes)
 Matt Lanter as Liam Court (24 episodes)
 Gillian Zinser as Ivy Sullivan (22 episodes)

Recurring
 Justin Deeley as Austin Talridge (17 episodes)
 Trevor Donovan as Teddy Montgomery (15 episodes)
 Arielle Kebbel as Vanessa Shaw (10 episodes)
 Cameron Goodman as Bree (9 episodes)
 Manish Dayal as Raj Kher (7 episodes)
 Megalyn Echikunwoke as Holly Stickler (7 episodes)
 Josh Zuckerman as Max Miller (7 episodes)
 Yani Gellman as Diego Flores (7 episodes)
 Nick Zano as Preston Hillingsbrook (6 episodes)
 Robert Hoffman as Caleb Walsh (6 episodes)
 Tiffany Hines as Kat (6 episodes)
 Chris McKenna as Patrick Westhill (5 episodes)
 Niall Matter as Greg (5 episodes)
 Sara Foster as Jennifer "Jen" Clark (4 episodes)
 Ryan Rottman as Shane (4 episodes)
 Michelle Hurd as Rachel Gray (4 episodes)
 Summer Bishil as Leila Shirazi (4 episodes)
 Kristina Apgar as Jane Mcdohpy (4 episodes)
 Chloe Bridges as Alexis (3 episodes)
 Caitlin Thompson as Madison (3 episodes)
 Stephen Amell as Jim Mcdohpy (2 episodes)

Special Guest Stars
 Brandy Norwood as Marissa Harris-Young (5 episodes)
 Billy Ray Cyrus as Judd Ridge (2 episodes)
 Vinny Guadagnino as himself (2 episodes)
 Kellie Pickler as Sally (1 episode)
 Perez Hilton as himself (1 episode)
 Janice Dickinson as herself (1 episode)
 La Toya Jackson as Marilyn (1 episode)
 Cobra Starship as themselves (1 episode)
 Nick Carter as himself (1 episode)

Episodes

Production 

On , TV Line announced that Rebecca Sinclair would not renew her contract as executive producer for season four. On , The CW officially renewed 90210 for a fourth season. On , it was announced that former Life Unexpected executive producers Patti Carr and Lara Olsen had been hired to take over the series. Their production credits also include Private Practice.

On , with the reveal of The CW's 2011–12 schedule, it was announced the series would be returning to Tuesday at  Eastern/ Central as a lead-in to new Sarah Michelle Gellar series, Ringer. The fourth season premiered on Tuesday, . On August 3, 2011, The CW ordered two additional episodes for the fourth season, which will now total at 24.

A "Rock the Vote" themed episode aired in October, where Cobra Starship performed their new single "#1Nite." Episode 8 was in Las Vegas. All American Rejects performed in the fifteenth episode of the season.

The CW originally announced as the series would return from its mid-season hiatus with new episodes on January 10, 2012. However, The CW later announced 90210 would return on January 17 to lead into the series premiere of new reality series, "Remodeled". American rock band, Train, appeared in an episode which aired in February 2012. The band performed their latest single "Drive By" in their cameo appearance. The same episode saw the characters going to a music festival in the desert.

Cast and characters 
Before the end of the third season, it was announced that Lori Loughlin and Ryan Eggold would not be returning to the series' fourth season. However, Loughlin has already been asked to return for "some episodes," by the former CW president, if her schedule permits it. The CW press release for their 2011–12 season, included all cast members Shenae Grimes, Tristan Wilds, AnnaLynne McCord, Jessica Stroup, Michael Steger, Jessica Lowndes, Matt Lanter, Trevor Donovan and Gillian Zinser. AnnaLynne McCord confirmed in an interview with Entertainment Weekly that the cast would be cut down by the new showrunners, though McCord was assured she would be back. Trevor Donovan was the first cast member to be dropped as a series regular for the fourth season, although, he will return as a guest star for five episodes in the Fall. Manish Dayal will be returning to the series in a recurring role as Ivy's dying husband, Raj. Donovan will be the only series regular dropped from the series. Five new recurring characters will be introduced in the Fall. Austin, described as a charming and hunky cowboy and the son of a country music superstar. Holly, Naomi's rival at California University. Jeremy, a student at CU who forges an immediate connection with Annie, but may have an ulterior motive. Jane, a young widow and love-interest for Liam, and Leila, Navid's younger and trouble making sister. Producers are also looking to cast Navid's uncle, Amal who was also his father's business partner. He is described as charming on the surface, but a bad guy and somebody "you don't want to mess with." Kristina Apgar, Megalyn Echikunwoke and Justin Deeley were later cast as Jane, Holly and Austin. Stephen Amell also reported that he signed to appear on the show for at least two or more episodes playing Jim Conrad who will get involved with Liam's life. Josh Zuckerman will return as Naomi's boyfriend, Max, for a handful of episodes. Cameron Goodman also secured a recurring spot role, playing Bree a college student who convince Annie to work as a professional escort. Brooklyn-based rapper, Theophilus London, made a guest appearance while performing at Naomi's College Kick-Off party in her new mansion, in the season premiere. Drew Seeley was cast in the series, but was later replaced by Supernatural actor Matt Cohen in the role of Jeremy. Freddie Smith will not return as Teddy's boyfriend, Marco, as their relationship ended over the summer. Former Buffy the Vampire Slayer star, Sarah Hagan, will play Alana, a member of the sorority Naomi joined in a recurring role. 
R&B singer, Brandy Norwood will have a major arc in the fourth season. Her character Marissa Harris-Young, who is due to make her debut in October, is said to be a young politician hoping to get elected to congress. She is running against the conservative uncle of Teddy. In order to increase her chances, Marissa hires Silver to make a campaign video aimed at young people. Sean Wing has landed a role as a recurring guest star. His character Nick is described as a "scruffy-handsome" graduate student with an interest in photography. Nick, who works for National Geographic, is also said to be charming and a traveler. He ends up falling for one of the female characters, but she is already in a relationship. Kellie Pickler is set to make her acting debut as Sally, the country-singing cousin of local cowboy Austin. Former Gigantic star, Ryan Rottman, will guest star as Shane, a smart, handsome gay 20-something who is confident in his identity and is committed to fighting for marriage equality. Chris McKenna has signed on for multiple episodes to play Patrick, a businessman who falls for Annie, he is described as "rich, powerful and very charming". Former Nikita star, Tiffany Hines has landed a recurring role as a police officer called Kat. Jersey Shore's Vinny Guadagnino will guest-star as a celebrity who gets involved in a high-stakes poker game with Liam. Billy Ray Cyrus has been cast as Austin's father, Judd Ridge, a country and western star. His episode will air in November. E! Online confirmed that Eureka alum Niall Matter would join the cast as Greg, a new love-interest for Silver. Janice Dickinson will appear as herself in a November episode, as a famous fashion celebrity judging student competition. 

Original Beverly Hills, 90210 star Dina Meyer appeared as a modeling agent who takes a special interest in Liam's career. Michelle Hurd will appear as a guest star playing Rachel, Naomi's boss and Holly's mother. Arielle Kebbel will join the series in a recurring role in December as Vanessa, a girl with a rather promiscuous past who still, occasionally finds herself making risky choices. Matt Lanter hinted that Vanessa maybe a new love interest for his character Liam, "She may be Liam's next love interest. It's going to be fun. It's kind of a mystery," he said in an interview with E!. Arielle Kebbel's character is described as a "female Liam". Entertainment Weekly reported that Sara Foster would return for three episodes in the latter half of the season, as Naomi's sister Jen Clark. Nick Zano was also cast as Preston Hillingsbrook, a playboy with a lot of cash to blow as the heir to his family's fortune. It was revealed that his character will first become friends with Annie, but will also get romantically involved with another woman on the show. La Toya Jackson will guest star in an episode which will air in February. Her character is said to be a brilliant and powerful music executive, who ends up forcing Dixon to make a tough decision by making him a great offer. Step Up 2 actor Robert Hoffman will guest star Caleb, a student at seminary school studying to become a priest. When Hoffman's character isn't studying he's a laid back surfer, passionate about community service. He won't make his appearance until a March episode. Pretty Little Liars cast Yani Gellman was cast in a multiple guest arc playing the bad boy Diego, the new potential love interest of Ivy Sullivan. American Idol season 10 runner-up, Haley Reinhart, will guest star as herself. Reinhart will appear in the March 27 episode, performing at a showcase. She will also sing the first single off her debut album during her appearance.

Trevor Donovan will return to the series towards the end of the season. Tristan Wilds will take a break from the series due to illness. He will be absent from the final episodes of the season as his character heads on a music tour. Manish Dayal, whose last appearance was in the 10th episode, will return in the 19th episode titled "The Heart Will Go On".

Storylines 
The fourth season will follow the group after high school. Some will head to college, while some will begin their careers, while all trying to maintain their friendships and create new ones. Matt Lanter said of the transition to college, "There's real world possibilities that open up when you go to college now, so I'm really looking forward to the stories that they come up with and how they can be exciting in a real life way rather than just walking down the school hallways." It was announced that a major male character will develop a drug habit. Later revealed to be Dixon. It has also been revealed that only one series regular will be attending college full-time. Executive producer Patti Carr revealed that Naomi will buy an over-the-top mansion that she'll turn into a sorority house where friends such as Annie, Silver and newlyweds Ivy and Raj will live. It has also been revealed that Dixon won't be going to college, he will instead pursue a music career. In the "Rock the Vote" themed episode, Naomi will throw a lavish registration party at her mansion. Navid and Silver will be forced to act as parents and look after Navid's sister, who decides to stay in L.A. when her family moves to Switzerland. Navid will also hire Silver to work for him, so they can spend more time together.

Kristin Dos Santos reported that Annie will begin a new profession after Marla's family contest the will left to her. Michael Ausiello later reported that she will become a professional escort. Liam will become a male model this season. Teddy will get "married" (Same-sex marriage is not recognized in Nevada.) to his boyfriend, Shane in the Las Vegas episode, scheduled to air in early November. Adrianna will reignite her musical dreams, and attempt to get her baby back. Matt Lanter revealed in an interview with Entertainment Weekly that the fall finale will end with a life or death situation with Liam. He said, "We're not really sure what happens to him or if he returns, how he returns." EW confirmed that Jen Clark will return for three episodes. Her debut will begin with a visit at the end of episode 16, with baby Jacques in tow. Jen coerces Naomi into helping her find a rich, eligible bachelor, but the guy ends up having eyes for Naomi, instead. Arielle Kebbel who portrays Vanessa, the girl who ran into Liam, told "As the season continues, Liam and Vanessa get closer and learn they have similar troubled pasts." She also added, "I think that brings them closer together. Instead of judging each other's pasts, they see the good in one another and encourage change for the future."

At the end of the mid-season premiere, Silver discovered that the man she has been dating is also the man who adopted Adrianna's baby.

Reception 
The season opened to a 0.9 Adults 18–49 rating, even with last season's premiere.

DVD release
The DVD release of season four was released after the season has completed broadcast on television. It has been released in Regions 1, 2 and 4. As well as every episode from the season, the DVD release features bonus material such as deleted scenes, gag reels and behind-the-scenes featurettes.

References 

2011 American television seasons
2012 American television seasons
Universities and colleges in art